Challis Jr. Sr. High School is a school in Challis, Idaho.

The former Challis High School, a building at 701 Main Ave. in Challis, Idaho, was listed on the National Register of Historic Places in 1980.  It was destroyed by the 1983 Borah Peak earthquake.

It was a stone building, built of local tuff stone, which demonstrated "the persistence of the false-front idea in Challis architecture. Here, the false front masks a simpler gabled schoolhouse and projects an image more in keeping with urban schools of the period."

References

High schools in Idaho
National Register of Historic Places in Custer County, Idaho
Art Deco architecture in Idaho
Buildings and structures completed in 1922